The Lake Placid Invitational Tournament was a college men's ice hockey tournament played after Christmas at the Jack Shea Arena in Lake Placid, New York.

History
The tournament began as an 8-team tournament in 1938 with participating teams playing 3 games apiece. The series was played every year until the majority of college hockey teams suspended their programs due to World War II. The tournament was not revived after the war despite most former participants restarting their programs.

The invitees were from New York state and the surrounding regions. When Massachusetts State suspended their program in 1939, their position was filled by Colgate. Hamilton was replaced in 1940 by Lehigh. St. Lawrence suspended their program in 1941 and was replaced by New Hampshire. Due to the beginning of World War II, Lehigh, New Hampshire and Union declined to participate and the tournament was converted into a 6-team round robin format when Hamilton returned.

The winner of the tournament received the Samuel H. Packer Trophy.

Results

1938

Final rankings

1939*

Final rankings

1940

Final rankings

1941

Final rankings

1942

Round Robin

Final rankings

* The 1939 tournament took place in January of 1940.

References

College ice hockey tournaments in the United States
College sports in New York (state)
Ice hockey in New York (state)
Sports competitions in New York (state)